O Manase (meaning: O Mind) is Indian fortnightly youth magazine published in Kannada language, in Karnataka, India. Journalist Ravi Belagere is the CEO and editor of the magazine.

Sister publications
Hai Bangalore, a weekly Kannada language tabloid

See also
 List of Kannada-language magazines
 Media in Karnataka
 Media of India

References

Biweekly magazines published in India
Kannada-language magazines
Mass media in Bangalore
Youth magazines